The Illustrated Bible Dictionary, better known as Easton's Bible Dictionary, is a reference work on topics related to the Christian Bible, compiled by Matthew George Easton. The first edition was published in 1893, and a revised edition was published the following year. The most popular edition, however, was the third,  published by Thomas Nelson in 1897, three years after Easton's death. The last contains nearly 4,000 entries relating to the Bible. Many of the entries in Easton's are encyclopedic in nature, although there are also short dictionary-type entries.

Because of its age, it is now a public domain resource.

See also
 Bauer lexicon
 Smith's Bible Dictionary, another popular 19th-century Bible dictionary

Notes

References

Editions

External links

 
 
  Android app.
  iOS app.

1897 books
Bible dictionaries
Reference works in the public domain

1897 in Scotland
Scottish non-fiction books